M. A. Chidambaram Stadium, commonly known as the Chepauk Stadium, is a cricket stadium in Chennai, Tamil Nadu, India. Established in 1916, it is the second oldest cricket stadium in the country after Eden Gardens in Kolkata. Formerly known as Madras Cricket Club Ground, the stadium is named after M. A. Chidambaram Chettiar, former president of BCCI and Head of TNCA. It is the home ground of the Tamil Nadu cricket team and the Indian Premier League team Chennai Super Kings. Chepauk hosted its first Test match on 10 February 1934, the first Ranji Trophy match in 1936 and the Indian cricket team's first test victory in 1952 against England. The 1986 India-Australia match held at Chepauk was only the second ever Tied Test in the history of the game.

Location
The stadium is located at Chepauk, a few hundred meters from Marina beach along the Bay of Bengal. The stadium can be accessed from Wallajah Road in the north, Babu Jagjivanram Road in the west and Pycrofts Road in the south. The stadium is connected through the Chennai Metro by the Government Estate station. It is also connected through the Chepauk MRTS railway station which lies on the Chennai Beach—Velachery section of the Chennai MRTS. The Buckingham Canal runs tangentially to the north side of the stadium.

Chepauk stadium is located across Chepauk Palace, the official residence of the Nawab of Arcot from 1768 to 1855. The stadium site used to be part of the palace grounds of the Chepauk Palace. Three Indo Saracenic style pillars at the entrance of the stadium are the last remnants of the association with the erstwhile palace grounds. The pillars construction are dated back to the rule of Nawab Muhammed Ali Khan Wallajah

History
In 1859, Madras Presidency acquired Chepauk palace in an auction for 589,000. In 1865, the government gave permission to build a pavilion at the palace grounds to Madras Cricket Club. The pavilion was finished in 1866. The pavilion was reconstructed in 1892 and was utilized till 1982 when it was demolished as part of the stadium renovation.

Chepauk Stadium was established in 1916 and has been the home venue of the Tamil Nadu cricket team ever since. It is the second oldest cricket stadium in the country after Eden Gardens in Kolkata, still holding all international cricket matches. Bombay Gymkhana being the first is not in use for international cricket.

From 1960 to 1988, Chennai hosted a test match in second week of January and was termed the Pongal Test as the match coincided with the Pongal harvest festival.

Renovations
The plan consisted of constructing three new reinforced concrete stands designated I, J, and K accommodating 12,000 spectators and 24 hospitality boxes under translucent PTFE membrane roofs. Hopkins Architects, London and Nataraj & Venkat Architects, Chennai were contracted by the Tamil Nadu Cricket Association.

The renovation was completed in 2011 and the old roofing with pillars that often blocked the view in the old stadium were replaced by light quad conical roofing held together by cables. The stadium can currently accommodate 50,000 spectators. The stands are at a gradient of 36° and lets the sea breeze in to get the ground's traditional swing back.

On 31 March 2015, the Supreme Court ruled that the renovation violates regulations relating to public safety. The court ruled that the parts of the renovation which violate the regulations must be demolished and until the appropriate planning permissions are issued and the demolition is complete, three stands (I, J, K) must remain sealed. After their construction, cricket matches took place in the stadium with the I, J, and K stands locked for spectators. The stands were finally de-sealed and opened in March 2020.

In December 2021, the old Anna pavilion, Anna pavilion stand and MCC clubhouse were demolished to make way for a new pavilion and new stands.This is expected to be complete in 2023. Along with this, temporary seating and standing are getting removed and permanent seating are installed bringing down the capacity to 40,000.  This is done at a cost of ₹139 crore ($16.9 million). 

The new stand which will house the Anna Pavilion at the M. A. Chidambaram Stadium is set to be named after former Tamil Nadu chief minister M. Karunanidhi. A cutting-edge indoor training facility will be located on the ground floor of the redesigned Anna Pavilion. It will be inaugurated on March 17 2023 by the Tamil Nadu CM M. K. Stalin accompanied by Chennai Super Kings Captain MS Dhoni. At that time, a new Madras Cricket Club stand will also be completed. 

The TNCA has created an exception to honour the deceased five-time CM Karunanidhi, even though none of the stands are named after any former player, administrator, or politician. He passed away in 2018. Karunanidhi had a regular presence at games at Chepauk throughout his political career. He was elected as an MLA there during his last two terms as chief minister.

Lease
The total area of the stadium is 752,000 square feet. This is under lease agreement between government and the association. In April 2015, the lease agreement between the government and association lapsed.

In November 2019, the lease period of the stadium was extended by the Tamil Nadu government for 21 years from 2015.

Notable events
 The first match of the Ranji Trophy was held on 4 November 1934 between Madras and Mysore at Chepauk. M J Gopalan of Madras bowled the first ball to N Curtis.
 India recorded their first test victory, in their 24th match, against England at Chepauk in 1952.
 The second ever Tied Test in cricket history was played here between India and Australia in 1986.
 Sunil Gavaskar scored his 30th test match century in 1983 breaking Don Bradman's record for most centuries in test cricket.
Narendra Hirwani's 8 wickets for 61 runs against the West Indies in January 1988 are the best bowling figures by an Indian on Test début and the third overall. As of December 2014, he is the only Indian cricketer to take ten or more wickets in Test debut. Hirwani's figures of 16 wickets for 136 runs in the match are a record for any bowler on début.
 Saeed Anwar of Pakistan scored 194 against India in 1997, the highest ODI score at that time.  
 On 15 October 2004, Shane Warne surpassed Muttiah Muralitharan's tally of 532 Test wickets to become the highest wicket taker during the time.
 Virender Sehwag scored 319 against South Africa, in the home series in April 2008 in the first Test at M A Chidambaram Stadium in Chennai, having reached 300 off just 278 balls, the fastest triple century in test history. Sehwag became only the third batsman after Donald Bradman and Brian Lara to score two triple centuries in Test Cricket. He scored 257 runs the third day of the match, which was the most runs scored by an individual batsman on a single day of a Test match since 1954, when Denis Compton made 273 runs on the second day of the Nottingham Test against Pakistan.
Rahul Dravid completed 10,000 test runs in Chepauk Stadium against South Africa in the same match where Sehwag scored 319. Rahul Dravid eventually made a 100 in that test innings as well.
 Sachin Tendulkar has scored more runs in Chepauk than any other venue in India with 876 runs in nine Tests at an average of 87.60.
 On 22 March 2001, India defeated Australia by 2 wickets to clinch the Border Gavaskar Trophy following India's win in Kolkata which ended the 16 match winning streak of Australia in test matches.
 India's 387/4 in the fourth innings of the first Test against England in December 2008, became the highest successful run chase in a test match in India.
Mahendra Singh Dhoni scored 224 in the 1st test against Australia in the home series on 24 February 2013. He is the first Indian Wicket-keeper Batsman to score a Double Century in Test Cricket and 7th Wicket-keeper in Test Cricket to do so. India finished the innings on 572.
Karun Nair scored 303* not out in the 5th test against England in the home series on 19 December 2016. India declared in the innings on 759–7, their highest team total. He became the 6th youngest batsman to score 300 and the 2nd Indian (after Virender Sehwag) to do so.
Joe Root scored 218 (337) in the 1st test against India in their away series on 6 February 2021. This made him score the highest score by an English cricketer in India, and also the highest score in the 100th test of any individual.

Statistics and Records

International Cricket Matches

Test Batting Records

Cricket World Cup
This stadium has hosted 7 Men's One Day International matches across 3 world cups. In addition, the stadium has also hosted a semifinal in the 1997 Women's Cricket World Cup.

The World cup matches hosted by this stadium are as follows:

Men's Cricket World Cup
1987 Cricket World Cup

1996 Cricket World Cup

2011 Cricket World Cup

Women's Cricket World Cup

See also
List of Test cricket grounds
List of international cricket five-wicket hauls at M. A. Chidambaram Stadium

References

External links

Upcoming Matches at Chennai
M.A Chidambaram Stadium Notable Events

Test cricket grounds in India
Sports venues in Chennai
Cricket grounds in Tamil Nadu
Cricket in Chennai
1987 Cricket World Cup stadiums
1996 Cricket World Cup stadiums
2011 Cricket World Cup stadiums
1916 establishments in India
Sports venues completed in 1916
20th-century architecture in India